Chris Moore is an American film producer and director who has worked in the industry since the 1990s. Moore's first film was Glory Daze (1995), followed by successes Good Will Hunting (1997) and American Pie (1999). In addition to producing films throughout the 2000s and 2010s, he has also produced television such as the first three seasons of Project Greenlight. He has directed two films, Kill Theory and The People Speak, both released in 2009.

Life and career
Moore was born in Easton, Maryland, where he grew up. He went to Harvard University where he studied American history. He worked as a production assistant at USA Network for two summers and found an opportunity to work as an intern for USA Network's comedy TV series Up All Night. When Moore graduated from Harvard, he moved to Los Angeles with friends and began working in the mailroom at an agency. He eventually got promoted to literary agent and sold several scripts; some became films: The Stoned Age, PCU, Airheads, Last Action Hero, and My Girl. When Moore's agency was acquired by ICM, he left and strove to become a film producer. With friends, he raised money to produce the film Glory Daze. He knew Matt Damon from Harvard in passing, and he approached Damon to star in the film. Damon turned down the opportunity in favor of paid work but introduced Moore to his friend Ben Affleck, who ultimately starred in Glory Daze. Afterward, Damon and Affleck wrote the screenplay for what would be Good Will Hunting, and they involved Moore as co-producer in its production.

Moore became involved as producer for the 1999 film American Pie, which was a breakout hit. Moore subsequently produced its sequels. In June 2002, Moore co-founded the multimedia company LivePlanet with Damon, Affleck, and screenwriter/producer Sean Bailey. Moore became CEO of LivePlanet, and the company produced the TV series Project Greenlight as well as several films.

In 2016, he produced Manchester by the Sea through his production company, The Media Farm, in which he was nominated for an Academy Award.

Moore is married to Jenno Topping, who is also a film producer. They have a daughter named Maddie and a son.

Filmography
He was a producer in all films unless otherwise noted.

Film

As director

As an actor

Miscellaneous crew

Thanks

Television

As writer

References

External links 

American film producers
Living people
Year of birth missing (living people)
Harvard University alumni